Korsun may refer to:

Places
 Korsun, Slavic name for the ancient Greek colony of Chersonesos Taurica in Crimea
 a name of Korsun-Shevchenkivskyi, Ukraine before 1944
 Korsun, Donetsk Oblast, an urban-type settlement in Donetsk Oblast, Ukraine

Other
 Korsun (surname)
 Battle of Korsun, in 1648 during the Khmelnytsky Uprising
 Battle of Korsun-Cherkassy Pocket between Nazi Germany and Soviet Union in 1944 during World War II
 Decisive Battles of WWII: Korsun Pocket, a computer game based on the Battle of the Korsun-Cherkassy Pocket

See also